The Caswell–Taylor House was a historic home located at 803 North Fourth Avenue in the Fourth and Gill neighborhood of Knoxville, Tennessee.  It is also known as The Governor's House, as it was the home of Governor Robert Love Taylor for several years.

The house included a variety of architectural styles, including Queen Anne, Late Victorian and Eastlake.  The property, a private residence, was on the National Register of Historic Places.

Notes

External links
 National Register of Historic Places

Houses in Knoxville, Tennessee
Houses on the National Register of Historic Places in Tennessee
Houses completed in 1886
National Register of Historic Places in Knoxville, Tennessee
Governor of Tennessee